Thabiso Dlamini (born 27 May 1993) is a Swazi boxer. He competed in the 2020 Summer Olympics. He was a batonbearer for the 2022 Commonwealth Games Queen's Baton Relay when the baton came to his nation in December 2021.

References

External links
 

1993 births
Living people
Boxers at the 2020 Summer Olympics
Swazi male boxers
Olympic boxers of Eswatini